Ajyguýy is a village in Ýasga geňeşligi, Bereket District, Balkan Province, Turkmenistan approximately 50 km north-east of Balkanabat.

References

Populated places in Balkan Region